Sharon Maria Suzanne Jaklofsky (born 30 September 1968 in Brisbane, Queensland) is a retired Dutch long jumper, who was born in Australia. A former heptathlete, she represented the Netherlands at the 1996 Summer Olympics in Atlanta, United States. There she reached the final, where she didn't manage to earn a correct jump.

Between 1994 and 2000 Jaklofsky gathered fourteen Dutch titles, mainly in the hurdles and long jump events, at indoor and outdoor championships.

Jaklofsky ran track collegiately at Louisiana State University.

Competition record

1No mark in the final

References
  Dutch Olympic Committee

External links

1968 births
Living people
Dutch female long jumpers
Dutch female hurdlers
Australian female long jumpers
Australian heptathletes
Australian people of Dutch descent
Athletes (track and field) at the 1986 Commonwealth Games
Athletes (track and field) at the 1990 Commonwealth Games
Athletes (track and field) at the 1996 Summer Olympics
Commonwealth Games silver medallists for Australia
Dutch people of Australian descent
LSU Lady Tigers track and field athletes
Olympic athletes of the Netherlands
Athletes from Brisbane
World Athletics Championships athletes for Australia
World Athletics Championships athletes for the Netherlands
Commonwealth Games medallists in athletics
Universiade medalists in athletics (track and field)
Universiade silver medalists for the Netherlands
Medalists at the 1995 Summer Universiade
Medallists at the 1990 Commonwealth Games